Atton Rand is a fictional character and party member in Obsidian Entertainment's 2004 action role-playing video game Star Wars: Knights of the Old Republic II - The Sith Lords. Within the series, Atton is a human pilot encountered by the Jedi Exile, the protagonist of The Sith Lords, on the asteroid mining station Peragus II, where he joins the player's party and assumes the role of pilot in command of the spacecraft, the Ebon Hawk. Atton was designed with Han Solo as the character archetype. A number of subplots involving the character were cut during development due to time and technical constraints, but were later curated and restored by The Sith Lords Restored Content Modification, a fan mod utilizing hidden assets within the game's code over the period of a decade after the original game's release. He is voiced by Nicky Katt.

Atton has received a positive reception, though several reviewers relied on fan-restored expanded content to fully inform their views of the character. Praise was focused on his layered characterization as a wisecracking everyman hiding a dark past, as well as his tendency to talk and joke constantly, including breaking the fourth wall for humorous effect.

Concept and design
The lead writer for The Sith Lords, Chris Avellone noted that one aspect of what made the first Knights of the Old Republic game a seminal work was its party companions. For the sequel, which represented the developers' spin on the events and physics of the Star Wars media franchise, Avellone wanted deep characters as well as an extensive amount of verbal interaction with characters in the world to convey the sense that the fate of the player character and their associates are the most important things in the galaxy. To add more depth to companions interactions, the developers incorporated skill checks into dialogues and quests; fully fleshed out companion back stories, with the exploration of their pasts an optional undertaking at the player's discretion; and developed an influence system where the player character's dark and light side struggles could be mirrored in their companions, which reinforces one of the game's main story aspects.

Brian Menze, the concept artist behind the visual identities of most of the Jedi Exile's party members in the game, was tasked with drawing a character patterned after Han Solo by the designer assigned to his in-game model on very short notice. Menze's initial image of Rand was based on the singer Robert Palmer, and the character's costume design draws from Solo's attire. During the design process, it was decided that Atton should serve as a love interest for the player character, and he was made younger from the original concept. His name was originally the unused name of the main character of Star Wars: Jedi Knight: Jedi Academy early during the game's development: the player character of Jedi Academy was eventually named Jaden Korr. This is referenced as an easter egg in The Sith Lord's final release.

Will Beckman and Darragh O'Farrell, then-voice directors at LucasArts, explained in a 2004 interview with GameSpot that they "wanted to stick with something of a formula" when they set out to cast and record the game's characters. They wanted to preserve the "same sort of genuine Star Wars feel" which was successfully captured in the first game; for example, they considered casting a professional Han Solo impersonator for Atton at one point, as they desired an actor whose voice is reminiscent of a young Harrison Ford. Atton was ultimately given more of a unique identity as they decided against the idea of a straightforward imitation, and would encourage the actor to bring their own personality to the character. They also learned from experience that video games dialogue were often written more like adventure game text than a film script, and as such they required actors who could competently portray "snappy dialogue" from their reading of paragraph text. The role of Atton eventually went to Nicky Katt; Beckman and O'Farrell considered him to be a fresh voice who was not part of the "usual pool of voice actors who have performed in most video games at the time", and praised him for bringing the "tempo and energy needed to carry that first part of the game where he has a lot of dialogue". They also noted Katt's physical resemblance to Menze's concept drawings of the character.

Atton was featured in a number of plot scenarios that were eventually cut from the final game. One particular cut content of note is a boss encounter which hinges on Atton's solitary participation at a predetermined point in the narrative, where the player assumes control of him to fight off the Sith Lord Darth Sion. In one proposed ending, if the Exile is female, he would die from wounds inflicted by Sion if defeated in the boss battle, and as he lays dying in the Exile’s arms, he confesses that he loved her all along. Members of The Sith Lords fan community group pieced together a narrative through the fragmented code, which included innumerable unused original assets and voice-over recordings, and incorporated these alterations into a mod known as The Sith Lords Restored Content Modification or TSLRCM, which has seen intermittent updates in the years after the game's original release.

Character

Atton Rand is depicted as a roguish scoundrel who is an avid player of the Pazaak card game, and hides his dark past behind a laidback attitude; his irreverent style and predilection for Pazaak are part of the mental defenses he has built against the mind manipulation abilities of Force users. Atton and his sense of humour serve as a counterweight and foil to Kreia's dour lectures as the Exile's mentor, balancing her crusty tone by acting as comic relief and making snarky quips about every character and every situation that he encounters.

As part of his back story, Atton was once an airman in service of the Republic army, who grew to despise the Jedi Order and came to see them as hypocritical cowards who swear fealty to the Republic but fail to step up when they are needed. He later joined Revan's cause, and underwent intensive training to become a deadly hunter of Jedi. When recounting his experience of being an assassin for the Sith, Atton claims there is no functional difference between the opposing factions as the average person does not care about what side of the Force someone is on, though he is haunted by his internalized guilt of murdering Jedi and considers himself to be  beyond forgiveness. If the player accumulates enough influence with Atton, he develops a genuine respect for the Exile and chooses to follow them of his own volition, even allowing himself to be trained as an apprenticed Force user. Atton may also develop feelings for a female player character, though there is no fully fledged romance in the original release.

Atton is an example of a stock character who makes throwback references to other works in the Star Wars media franchise, such as Han Solo's signature "I have a bad feeling about this" quote. Under certain conditions, for example if the player completes the game at least once, Atton will break the fourth wall during his introductory conversation with the Exile in the next play-through, such as explaining the origins of his name or lampooning a young Anakin Skywalker's first line of dialogue to Padme Amidala in Star Wars: Episode I – The Phantom Menace.

Appearances
Atton is a human pilot that the Jedi Exile meets on the asteroid mining station Peragus II. After the Exile frees him from a force cage at the facility and cooperates with him to escape, Atton reluctantly joins them in their travels. When Kreia discovers Atton’s past when they were imprisoned by the Jedi historian Atris on the planet Telos, she uses the information to blackmail him into remaining with the Exile's party as pilot of The Ebon Hawk. The Exile may also learn about Atton's proficiency in Echani combat techniques from speaking with Atris' Echani handmaidens, a fact which he attempts to cover up and feign ignorance about if questioned.

The Exile may later speak with a Twi'lek non-player character in the Refugee Sector in Nar Shadaa who reveals that he is an old acquaintance of Atton and knows about his secret. If the Exile accrues enough influence and successfully convinces Atton to reveal the truth about his past, he will reveal some incriminating details about himself, including the fact that he has fought in the Mandalorian Wars as well as the Jedi Civil War. Atton explains that he originally served with the Republic military forces under Revan's command, and when Revan fell to the dark side and turned on the government the Jedi had sworn to protect, Atton along with many other Republic military forces remained loyal to Revan, whom they consider to be their savior. During the Jedi Civil War, Atton was part of an elite Sith assassin unit, trained to resist Jedi Force powers and sent on missions to kill or capture Jedi to be broken and converted to the Sith. Later during the war, Atton was confronted by a female Jedi who informed him of his Force-sensitive nature and warned him that the Sith would undoubtedly compel him to train as a Dark Jedi if they find out about it. Atton struck her down, but before her death, she opened up her mind to his, giving him a glimpse of the Force as she saw it. Enraged, Atton killed her, though the impression she left caused him to become disillusioned, and he eventually deserted the Sith. The Exile has the option to forgive Atton, who is expecting to be punished for his crimes. At his request, he may be trained in the ways of the Jedi Sentinel, and he may be influenced to follow either the light or dark side of the Force.

Atton continues to travel with the Exile, participating in the defense of Telos against a Sith armada led by Darth Nihilus and, shortly after, taking the Exile to Malachor V where they went on to defeat Darth Sion and Darth Traya. Within the established Star Wars Legends continuity, Atton along several of the Exile's companions are supposed to survive the events of the game and help rebuild the Jedi Order; Kreia will prophesy their fates following her defeat if questioned by the Exile. If the Jedi Exile is female, as is the case with the canonical character Meetra Surik, the nature of Atton's relationship with her will be addressed through a few dialogue changes; however, the ending would be the same.

The resolution of Atton's character arc in Trayus Academy on the planet Malachor V was cut in its entirety in the final release of The Sith Lords. If a fan mod which restores the cut content is installed, Atton encounters Darth Sion after he flees from Kreia, who has reassumed her title as Darth Traya and incapacitates the Exile's other companions who have attempted to confront her. If Atton defeats Sion and survives the duel, he will escape with his life. Should Atton turn to the dark side and have a low influence rating with a player character who is female, he will attack fellow party member Mical out of jealousy for her affections.

Other appearances
The character makes no further appearances in Star Wars media works, though Atton has been mentioned in the MMO role playing game Star Wars: The Old Republic as well as several Star Wars reference books, such as Jedi vs. Sith: The Essential Guide to the Force and the second volume of The Complete Star Wars Encyclopedia. In addition, Wizards of the Coast created a miniature for the character, along with other characters in the Knights of the Old Republic series, which was released August 19, 2008.

Reception
Atton Rand's critical reception has been positive; while many sources commented on the apparent similarities between the character and Han Solo, Atton has also been praised for his layered, well-written characterization as a thought provoking subversion of similar character archetypes. Hilary Goldstein from IGN initially found Atton's constant attempts to imitate Han Solo in the early narrative to be annoying, but remarked that his characterization in the later portions of the game would surprise many players due to the dark secrets he hides behind his "ho-hum surface". Sam Dunn from Fan Sided noted that Atton claims "rare territory among cut-rate Han Solos, as he’s neither smuggler nor bounty hunter nor pirate". Atton has also been positively compared to Carth Onasi from the first game, with the former being considered the more interesting character. In an article published by The Escapist, OnlySP staff formed the view that Kreia and Atton stick out as strong examples of good characterization in The Sith Lords, lauding the latter for his "genuinely funny quips and a mellow attitude". Jen Rothery, a staff writer at PCGamesN, described her favorite The Sith Lords character as "enigmatic, charming, and flirtatious". Caleb Bailey from CBR ranked Atton's fourth wall breaking comments second on a list of unforgettably funny moments from the Star Wars Legends universe. Brian Winters, also from CBR, ranked Atton fourth on a list of Jedi characters from the various Star Wars Legends works that deserve to be more celebrated.

Atton's character arc has been praised for its depth. Fraser Brown from PCGamesN remarked that the optional content which allows the player to gain influence with Atton, steer his moral alignment to match the player character's and finally train him as a Force user, is a good example of a side quest which could be just as important as the main quest. Brown recalled that in his playthrough, he moulded Atton's personality into a heartless killer after the character breaks down emotionally and confesses his secret to his character about his murder of the Jedi who revealed his Force sensitive nature; he remarked that the choices he made which concludes the exploration of Atton's past were morally disturbing, but also compelling as a gameplay experience. Rothery said The Sith Lords as a whole is a compelling albeit atypical Star Wars story: the theme of Atton's story arc revolves around an individual’s relationship with the Force, and his attempt to deal with the actions of his past.

William Hughes from The A.V. Club said Atton's death at the hands of Darth Sion, a potential scenario restored by the TSLRCM mod, turned to be a profoundly sad and moving moment for him. He remarked that if he had persisted on winning the boss fight as Atton and deliberately refused to lose, he would have missed out on that experience, and that a deliberate choice to lose a gameplay challenge made for a better story than a win "ever possibly could" for him. Matthew Byrd from Den of Geek considered Atton to be one of the game's most important characters, and praised the fan-restored encounter with Darth Sion for providing a proper conclusion to the most enjoyable character story arc of The Sith Lords in his view. Rothery revisited The Sith Lords 15 years after her last playthrough with TSLRCM installed, and remarked that while the mod gave her closure as she had declined to finish the game due to her discovery of Atton's endgame content being removed in the final release, she did appreciate the original release of the game just as deeply during her younger years and that she funneled the emotional impact the game had on her "through the lens of romantic obsession". Byrd as well as Luke Winkie from Paste Magazine cited the TSLRCM project as proof of the dedication from the game's fanbase to salvage unused assets buried within the game's code and fix the narrative arcs for  characters like Atton, with Winkie remarking that "It seems almost criminal that players didn’t get to watch these scenes pay off on the disc. These characters meant something to people. Putting them out to pasture in crunchtime isn’t fair".

Nicky Katt's performance as Atton Rand has been praised. Dunn praised "the sheer snark" Katt projected through the character's "arsenal of quick-draw one-liners". Jen Rothery from PCGamesN recalled that Katt's performance was a major part of the character's appeal and got her interested in his body of work as an actor.

Analysis
Travis Annabel from IGN noted that redemption is a core theme to any Star Wars story; while characters like Atton have the opportunity to redeem himself for his past crimes, Annabel remarked that few of the game's main cast members are truly altruistic, which makes their narrative journey through the story of The Sith Lords much more interesting. Alexandra Jekic from Norwegian website Gamer claimed that Atton is an unreliable man with villainous traits yet comes across as strangely sympathetic at the same time, and that he is an example of a lost and unhappy character who had learned to live with the kind of person he has become, which she considers to be a recurring trope in Chris Avellone's writing work. Phil Owen from Kotaku remarked that "there are always reasons people follow evil leaders beyond those people themselves being evil", singling out Atton as an example who "puts a sympathetic face on those enemy hordes" and whose moral convictions is not rooted in rigid notions of good or evil, and noted that "the game truly is awash in grey areas". Reflecting on the theme of redemption and loss with Atton's potential death, which came through a story-mandated death outside the player’s control as opposed to being a consequence of their own actions, Hughes observed that players get emotionally attached to certain characters and would want them to continue sticking around.

Atton's role within the game is positioned to assert the lack of distinction between Jedi and Sith Orders from the masses' point of view, save that both sides possess powers capable of immense destruction. Owen discussed an early game conversation with Atton where the player character may argue with him over rumors and hearsay about how the aftermath of the so-called Jedi Civil War in the first game affects present events; aside from its primary function of maintaining continuity between the two games, a point is also made that it is irrelevant whether the Jedi-backed Republic or the Sith won the war within the wider context of the Knights of the Old Republic series' setting. In a research dissertation submitted to Edge Hill University, Eamon Reid emphasized dialogue exposition from Atton that highlights the unemployment crisis and callous exploitation faced by refugees in Nar Shadaa, which count many displaced war veterans hailing from all sides among their number, as a direct byproduct of the preceding wars. The reveal of Atton's backstory also highlights his personal suffering as he is caught in the constant violent struggles between the Jedi and Sith. An editorial published by the Official Xbox Magazine argued that since The Sith Lords "takes a universe of light and dark, and paints it in shades of grey", both factions' single-minded pursuit for balance of the Force could be compared to a religious schism, which holds little relevance for the rest of the galaxy but results in far reaching collateral damage.

References

External links

Star Wars Legends characters
Star Wars Jedi characters
Star Wars Sith characters
Star Wars video game characters
Fictional assassins in video games
Fictional criminals in video games
Fictional defectors
Fictional gamblers
Fictional murderers
Fictional space pilots
Fictional war veterans
Male characters in video games
Role-playing video game characters
Science fantasy video game characters
Video game characters introduced in 2004
Video game fandom
Video game sidekicks
Star Wars: Knights of the Old Republic characters